ABR, RhoGEF and GTPase activating protein is a protein that in humans is encoded by the ABR gene.

Function 

The ABR activator of RhoGEF and GTPase, also symbolized as ABR, gene is located on Chromosome 11 and has a reported 13 alternatively spliced transcript variants. This gene is found to have ubiquitous expression within 23 human tissues, including the heart and brain. The protein encoded by ABR shares homology with the Breakpoint Cluster Region (BCR) gene located on chromosome 22 and has shown to share similar protein functions. Additionally, the protein encoded by this gene contains a GTPase-activating protein domain, a domain found in members of the Rho family of GTP-binding proteins. The ABR gene is an inhibitor of ras-related C3 botulinum toxin substrate 1 (RAC1), a protein found to influence cell growth, motility of the cell, and maintain adhesion to neighboring epithelial cells.  Recent papers suggest ABR has tumor suppressor properties in Leukemia because of its role as a RAC1 inhibitor and is being researched as a potential therapy treatment in Leukemia patients. Other studies suggest ABR plays an important role in vestibular morphogenesis.

References

Further reading